The parish of Kilcommon and Hollyford is an ecclesiastical parish in the Roman Catholic Archdiocese of Cashel and Emly. It includes the villages of Rearcross and Kilcommon in County Tipperary and the village of Hollyford in County Tipperary, Ireland. The parish is located in the Slieve Felim Mountains close to the border with County Limerick.

Churches
Churches within the parish include:
 St. Patrick's Church, Kilcommon
 St. Joseph's Church, Hollyford
 Our Lady of Visitation, Rearcross

Sport
Hollyford's local GAA club is Sean Treacy's GAA and is named after Irish rebel and IRA member Seán Treacy who was born nearby.

References

Parishes of the Roman Catholic Archdiocese of Cashel and Emly